56 Orionis is a single, variable star in the equatorial constellation of Orion. It has an orange hue and is faintly visible to the naked eye with an apparent visual magnitude that fluctuates around 4.76. The star is located at a distance of approximately 1,130 light years from the Sun based on parallax. It is drifting further away with a radial velocity of +11 km/s. The star has a peculiar velocity of  relative to its neighbors, and may be a runaway star.

This object is a bright giant star with a stellar classification of K2-IIb. It is a suspected variable star of unknown type with a brightness that has been measured varying from 4.73 down to 4.78. The star is about 61 million years old with 6.4 times the mass of the Sun and is spinning with a projected rotational velocity of 3.5. Having exhausted the supply of hydrogen at its core, the star has expanded to 92 times the radius of the Sun. It is radiating 2,547 times the Sun's luminosity from its enlarged photosphere at an effective temperature of 4,270 K.

It has one reported visual companion, designated component B, with magnitude 13.5 and angular separation .

References

K-type bright giants
Suspected variables
Runaway stars
Orion (constellation)
BD+01 1151
Orionis, 56
039400
027750
2037